Herman Tumurcuoglu (born October 30, 1972 in Montreal, Quebec) is an online reputation management expert, internet pioneer and lecturer.

He is the co-founder of Searchreputation.net, a boutique ORM agency.  In 1996, he launched one of the web's first tier 2 metasearch engine called Mamma.com. This engine was made as a Master’s thesis at Carleton University in 1995. Majority interest in the company was acquired for $25 Million in 1999. Herman sold the rest of his shares in 2001. He has been lecturing at McGill University and Concordia’s John Molson School of Business. His interests are in the areas of Reverse SEO and online reputation management.

See also
 Mamma.com
 Search syndication

References

External links

 

1972 births
Living people
Businesspeople from Montreal
Internet pioneers